West Somerset is a local government district in the county of Somerset which is in South West England. In the United Kingdom, the term listed building refers to a building or other structure officially designated as being of special architectural, historical or cultural significance; Grade II* structures are those considered to be "particularly significant buildings of more than local interest". Listing was begun by a provision in the Town and Country Planning Act 1947. Once listed, severe restrictions are imposed on the modifications allowed to a building's structure or its fittings. In England, the authority for listing under the Planning (Listed Buildings and Conservation Areas) Act 1990 rests with Historic England, a non-departmental public body sponsored by the Department for Digital, Culture, Media and Sport; local authorities have a responsibility to regulate and enforce the planning regulations.

West Somerset is a largely rural area covering . The district has a population, according to the 2011 census, of 35,300, with the largest centres of population in the coastal towns of Minehead and Watchet. The council's administrative headquarters are in the village of Williton.

There are 100 Grade II* listed buildings in West Somerset. The list includes a large number of churches and chapels, some of which are Norman. Stogursey Castle is also 12th century in origin. There are several churchyard and village crosses, which were small market crosses, dating from the 13th to 15th centuries. Packhorse bridges over Exmoor streams and some larger ones over rivers in the area are also included.
The houses on the list range from the Middle Ages to early 20th century. Agricultural buildings include tithe barns, dovecotes and a watermill.

Buildings

|}

See also
 Grade II* listed buildings in Somerset
 Grade I listed buildings in Somerset

Notes

References

External links

 
Lists of Grade II* listed buildings in Somerset